The following is a list of notable journals and magazines relating to birding and ornithology. The continent and country columns give the location where the journal or magazine is published and may not correspond with its scope or content.

See also 

 List of wildlife magazines

References

 
Lists of academic journals
Zoology-related lists
Ornithology